SAS Makhanda is a  of the South African Navy, currently configured as an Offshore Patrol Vessel.

She was commissioned in 1986 and originally named SAS Magnus Malan for South African Party minister of defence Magnus Malan, she was renamed on 1 April 1997. She was converted in 2012/2013 to an Offshore Patrol Vessel role.

The SAS Makhanda is currently employed with anti piracy patrols.

References

1986 ships
Missile boats of the South African Navy
Military units and formations in Durban